Maria Yi (born 29 July 1953) is a retired Chinese actress from Hong Kong. She appeared in films by Hong Kong's Golden Harvest Productions in the 1970s, most notably in The Big Boss and Fist of Fury, both starring Bruce Lee.

Career

Yi began acting as a teenager, She is an already-defunct Hong Kong actress and a graduate of the Taipei Jinlu Women's Business Vocational School before her debut. Active in the school's entertainment programs and drama performances, Hong Kong Jiahe Film Company owner Zou Wenhuai unearthed Yi Yi in Taiwan, and arranged her training in Taiwan office. She came to Hong Kong for the Golden Harvest Film Company in 1970. Filming a series of films, including the movie "The Big Boss" and "Fist of Fury", which is best known with the famous martial arts star Bruce Lee. She also co-produced a film with another martial arts star Wang Yu. Yi Yi married a businessman Xu Jingbo in June 1974. One of her guests at her wedding was her friend, The Big Boss and Fist of Fury star Nora Miao. In 1976, she made her final film "Tiger of Northland".

Filmography

Films

References

External links

 Maria Yi Yi at hkmdb.com

1953 births
Hong Kong film actresses
Living people
Taiwanese-born Hong Kong artists